You Got the Love may refer to:

 "You Got the Love", a 1986 dance single by The Source and Candi Staton
 "You Got the Love" (Rufus song), 1974
 "You've Got the Love", a song by Florence and the Machine; a cover of "You Got The Love" by Candi Station